This is a list of the National Register of Historic Places listings in Bell County, Texas.

This is intended to be a complete list of properties and districts listed on the National Register of Historic Places in Bell County, Texas. There are four districts, 66 individual properties, and one former property listed on the National Register in the county. The individually listed properties include 23 that are designated or contain Recorded Texas Historic Landmarks including one that is also a State Antiquities Landmark. Two districts contain several more Recorded Texas Historic Landmarks.

Current listings

The locations of National Register properties and districts may be seen in a mapping service provided.

|}

Former listing

|}

See also

National Register of Historic Places listings in Texas
Recorded Texas Historic Landmarks in Bell County

References

External links

Registered Historic Places
Bell County
Buildings and structures in Bell County, Texas